Estriol glucuronide (E3G), or oestriol glucuronide, also known as estriol monoglucuronide, as well as estriol 16α-β-D-glucosiduronic acid, is a natural, steroidal estrogen and the glucuronic acid (β-D-glucopyranuronic acid) conjugate of estriol. It occurs in high concentrations in the urine of pregnant women as a reversibly formed metabolite of estriol. Estriol glucuronide is a prodrug of estriol, and was the major component of Progynon and Emmenin, estrogenic products manufactured from the urine of pregnant women that were introduced in the 1920s and 1930s and were the first orally active estrogens. Emmenin was succeeded by Premarin (conjugated equine estrogens), which is sourced from the urine of pregnant mares and was introduced in 1941. Premarin replaced Emmenin due to the fact that it was easier and less expensive to produce.

Estrogen glucuronides can be deglucuronidated into the corresponding free estrogens by β-glucuronidase in tissues that express this enzyme, such as the mammary gland. As a result, estrogen glucuronides have estrogenic activity via conversion into estrogens.

The positional isomer of estriol 16α-glucuronide, estriol 3-glucuronide, also occurs as an endogenous metabolite of estriol, although to a much lower extent in comparison.

See also
 Catechol estrogen
 Estradiol glucuronide
 Estradiol sulfate
 Estrogen conjugate
 Estrone glucuronide
 Estrone sulfate
 Lipoidal estradiol

References

External links
 Metabocard for Estradiol 17-Glucuronide - Human Metabolome Database

Estranes
Estriol esters
Estrogens
Glucuronide esters
Hormones of the hypothalamus-pituitary-gonad axis
Hormones of the pregnant female
Human metabolites
Prodrugs
Sex hormones